The necropolis of Tuvixeddu is a Punic necropolis, the largest in the Mediterranean. It is located in a hill inside the city of Cagliari, Sardinia called Tuvixeddu (meaning "little cavity" in Sardinian).

History
Between the 6th and 3rd centuries BC the Carthaginians chose this hill to bury their dead: these burials were reached through a well dug into the limestone rock (from two to eleven meters deep), a small opening introduced to the burial chamber. The burial chambers were beautifully decorated; there were found amphorae and ampoules for the essences. Of particular interest among the Punic tombs, the "Uraeus Tomb" and the "Fighter Tomb", decorated with paintings of palm trees and masks, still well preserved. Another famous tomb is that "of the Wheel".

On the slopes of the Tuvixeddu hill there is a Roman necropolis, which overlooked the road at the exit of the city. The Roman necropolis consists mainly of arcosolium tombs and columbaria.

The necropolis opened to the public in May 2014, during the XVIII edition of Monumenti Aperti.

Paleogenetics
A 2017 Ancient DNA study by Claudia Viganó et al. found that a man buried ~2000 years ago in the necropolis of Tuvixeddu carried the cod39 mutation that cause Beta thalassemia. The paternal and maternal haplogroups of this individual, suggests that he was likely autochthonous of Sardinia.

Gallery

References

Sources
 
 
 
 
  IT\ICCU\CAG\0029495.

External links
 Special about Tuvixeddu on the official website of the Autonomous Region of Sardinia .
 The "Grotto of the Viper" (Grotta della Vipera) on SardegnaMappe .
 Portal about underground explorations in Tuvixeddu .

Buildings and structures completed in the 6th century BC
Archaeological sites in Sardinia
Cemeteries in Italy
Phoenician funerary practices
Carthage
Necropoleis